Lake Petén Itzá (Lago Petén Itzá) is a lake in the northern Petén Department in Guatemala. It is the third largest lake in Guatemala, after Lake Izabal and Lake Atitlán. The lake area presents high levels of migration, due to the existence of natural resources such as wood, chewing gum, oil, and agricultural and pasture activities. Because of its archaeological richness, around 150,000 tourists pass through this region yearly. The city of Flores, the capital of the Petén Department, lies on an island near its southern shore.

Several streams flow into Lake Petén Itzá, but it has no surface outflow. Although it loses water mostly by evaporation, it is not a salt lake.

Notable sites
There are at least 27 Maya sites around this lake and the archaeological remains of Tayasal, located across the lake on a peninsula close to the former Itza Maya capital, the last to be conquered in Mesoamerica in 1697.

Fauna
This lake and its surroundings have more than 100 important indigenous species such as the cichlid fish Mayaheros urophthalmus, Petenia splendida and Vieja melanurus, crocodiles (Crocodylus moreletii and Crocodylus acutus), jaguars (Panthera onca), pumas (Puma concolor), white-tailed deer (Odocoileus virginianus), Central American red brocket (Mazama temama),  and several bird species, including parrots such as macaws, and toucans.

Notes

References 
 Photos of the lake Peten Itzá
 Central Petén Maya Sites
 ETH Zurich Climate Geology Project: Lago Peten Itza

Peten Itza, Lake
Peten Itza
Geography of the Petén Department